Joost Berman (9 January 1793 – 18 March 1855) was a Dutch lawyer, judge, politician, poet, nonfiction writer, and editor.

Childhood and education 
Joost Berman was born in Ouwerkerk as the son of notary Maarten Berman (1769–1832) and Geertruida der Weduwen (1772?–1844). Along with some contemporaries from an evolving rural farming elite, he managed to complete his studies at the French and Latin schools. When he went on to study law at Leiden University (1814–1817), he was the first of these supposedly "farmer boys" to acquire higher education.

Legal, literary and political career 

After graduating, Joost Berman worked as an attorney in Zierikzee. Subsequently he was employed by the local court, serving as Assistant Clerk to the Court, Clerk to the Court, Judge of Peace, and from 1838 as Canton Judge. In 1843 Jacobus Boeije succeeded Berman as Canton Judge and Berman served again as Clerk to the Court until 1851. 

Joost Berman wrote several works of poetry mobilizing public opinion against the Belgian Revolution, supporting a continued Dutch rule over Belgium. His dissertation and some other nonfiction works were also published. Berman often wrote for magazines. From 1836 to 1847, Berman was co-editor of the "Zeeland People's Almanac" (Dutch: Zeeuwsche Volks-Almanak), alongside Rev. H.M.C. van Oosterzee. This annual series was published by the Zierikzee publisher Johannes van de Velde Olivier, who als published some of Berman's books. While meticulously covering all of Zeeland, both editors lived in Zierikzee, putting the northern island of Schouwen slightly more central in the Almanac than customary in Zeeland-showcasing publications.

In the elections of 26 September 1848 for the city council of Zierikzee, Joost Berman received 75 votes, just one vote less than the last candidate to receive a 9-year appointment to the council. Berman and the two candidates behind him were selected to fill in places of deceased council members for a "short" term of 6 years. Berman resigned from the Zierikzee court in 1851. There are indications of hardship around or following this decision.

Personal and death 
On 29 July 1817, Joost Berman married Neeltje Sevenhuizen (1797–1871) from Zierikzee. In 1823, Berman was released from serving in the Zierikzee's civil guard for health reasons.

Joost and Neeltje Berman had 12 children, 4 of whom died at a young age. Joost Berman's son, Alexander Johan, studied at Joost's alma mater to become the Dutch Reformed minister of Watergang. His grandson, Simon Berman, was the mayor of six municipalities in the Netherlands, the largest of which were Schagen, Bedum, and Alblasserdam.

Joost Berman died in Zierikzee on 18 March 1855, aged 62, after a disease his wife said lasted only 2 days.

Bibliography

Nonfiction
 1817 – De poenis secundarum nuptiarum [Latin: Penalties of the marriage] (Lugduni Batavorum)
 1819 – Iets bij gelegenheid der viering van het éénjarig bestaan van de Vlissingsche afdeeling der Maatschappij tot nut van 't Algemeen
 1834 – Beschrijving van de St. Lievens Monsterkerk, te Zierikzee, op den 7 october 1832, door brand ten eenemale verwoest (Van de Velde Olivier)
 1834 – Geschiedkundige beschrijving der St. Lievens Monster of Groote Kerk te Zierikzee [Historical description of the Sint-Lievensmonstertoren or Groote Kerk in Zierikzee] (Le Sage ten Broek)
 1836 – Troost bij het afsterven van den wel eerw. zeer gel. heer F. Pleyte [Consolation on the passing of the venerable, very educated Mr F. Pleyte] (Van de Velde Olivier)
 1841 – Ter nagedachtenis van den wel ed. J. de Kanter, Phz. [In memory of the good lord Johan de Kanter, Phz.]
 1854 – Beschrijving van den hooge watervloed te Zierikzee [Description of the high water flood at Zierikzee] (De Looze)

Poetry
 1827 – "Liefde voor het Vaderland" [Love for the Fatherland] contribution to Willem Kroef: Feestrede bij gelegenheid der viering van het derde halve eeuwfeest der verlossing van Zierikzee van de Spanjaarden (Van de Velde Olivier)
 1830 – Opwekking aan de bewoners van het platte land, tot deelneming in de vrijwillige militaire dienst (Van de Velde Olivier)
 1830 – Wapenkreet [Call to arms] (Van de Velde Olivier)
 1831 – Feestdronk toegebragt aan en ingesteld ten behoeve van de gekwetsten in Zeeland (Van de Velde Olivier)
 1831 – Hulde aan de nagedachtenis van J. C. J. van Speyk (Van de Velde Olivier)
 1831 – Warschau's val [Warsaw's fall] (Van de Velde Olivier)
 1831 – contribution to Gerard van Wieringhen Borski: Blik op den verledenen, tegenwoordigen en toekomenden toestand des Vaderlands (Van de Velde Olivier)
 1833 – Een drietal zangen van den dag [Three songs of the day] (Van de Velde Olivier)
 1852 – Hulde toegezongen aan den weled. geb. heere M. C. de Crane (De Looze)

Unpublished
 1839 – Brief aan Christianus Petrus Eliza Robidé van der Aa (letter)
 1834 – Wat wordt er van de ziel? (2 page manuscript)
 18?? – Aan mijne boeken (2 page manuscript)

References

External links 
 Joost Berman on Digital Library for Dutch Literature
 Joost Berman on Wiki Zeeland Library

Google Books 
 Beschrijving van de St Lievens Monsterkerk
 Dissertatio juridica inauguralis de poenis secundarum nuptiarum jure romano et hodierno
 Een drietal zangen van den dag
 Feestdronk
 Warschau's val
 Ter nagedachtenis van den wel. ed. z. g. heer J. de Kanter

1793 births
1855 deaths
19th-century Dutch judges
19th-century Dutch male writers
19th-century Dutch poets
19th-century Dutch politicians
Dutch magazine editors
Dutch male poets
Dutch members of the Dutch Reformed Church
Dutch monarchists
Dutch non-fiction writers
Leiden University alumni
Municipal councillors in Zeeland
People from Zierikzee
Male non-fiction writers